Gérard Pelletier,  (June 21, 1919 – June 22, 1997) was a Canadian journalist and politician.

Career 
Pelletier initially worked as a journalist for Le Devoir, a French-language newspaper in Montreal, Quebec. In 1961 he became editor-in-chief of the Montreal daily and North America's largest French circulating newspaper, La Presse.  Pelletier, with other French-Canadian intellectuals, Pierre Elliott Trudeau included, founded the journal Cité Libre.  First elected to Parliament in 1965, he served as a member of the cabinet of Pierre Elliott Trudeau.

Pelletier met Trudeau while studying in France and worked with him and Jean Marchand during the Asbestos Strike of 1949 in Quebec. Dubbed the "Three Wise Men" in English and Les trois colombes (The three doves) in French, they entered politics at the same time in the federal election of 1965. The trio was recruited by Liberal prime minister Lester Pearson to help derail the rising Quebec separatist movement.

He served in various cabinet posts in the Trudeau government until 1975 (Secretary of State: 1968–1973, Minister of Communications: 1973–5), when he left the Liberal caucus and became ambassador to France and then ambassador to the United Nations (1981–1984). In 1978 he was made a Companion of the Order of Canada.

Bibliography

As author
 
 
 
 
 
 
 
  (in three volumes)

Contributions

Electoral record

References

External links
 
 Gérard Pelletier fonds, Library and Archives Canada

1919 births
1997 deaths
French Quebecers
Ambassadors of Canada to France
Permanent Representatives of Canada to the United Nations
Liberal Party of Canada MPs
Members of the House of Commons of Canada from Quebec
Companions of the Order of Canada
Members of the King's Privy Council for Canada
People from Victoriaville